The following is a list of episodes for the television show Two Guys, a Girl and a Pizza Place (retitled Two Guys and a Girl in its third season). The show began as a short-run (13 episodes) mid-season replacement on March 10, 1998, following two pizza delivery boys, Pete Dunville (Richard Ruccolo) and Michael "Berg" Bergen (Ryan Reynolds). They are close friends with the feisty Sharon Carter (Traylor Howard), the spokesperson of Immaculate Chemicals. The show aired on Wednesday nights for most of its run until it was moved to the Friday night death slot to start its fourth season, in 2000. This resulted in a steep drop in ratings and the plug was pulled. The series finale was titled "The Internet Show," an episode where fans of the show could go online and vote for the outcome. In the end, they chose to have Ashley become pregnant with Pete's child, as opposed to either of the other two female characters, or nobody, becoming pregnant. Revelation Films released the complete series on region 2 DVD in the UK, 24 June 2013.

Series overview

Episodes

Season 1 (1998)

Season 2 (1998–99)

Season 3 (1999–2000)

Season 4 (2000–01)

References

External links 
 
 

Lists of American sitcom episodes
Episodes